The Union of Workers' Trade Unions of Niger (USTN) is a national trade union center in Niger. Formed in 1960 as the Union Nationale des Travailleurs du Niger (UNTN), the union was renamed in 1978 as the USTN.

The 1988 establishment of the National Movement of the Development Society (MNSD) in Niger saw close ties between the USTN and the MNSD. However, the USTN's support for the pro-democracy movement lead to tension, including police raids, and the 1990 detention of then secretary general Laouali Moutari.

The USTN is affiliated with the International Trade Union Confederation, and the Organization of African Trade Union Unity.

Notable members 

 Fatou Djibo - Treasurer, 1971.

See also

Trade unions in Niger

References

Trade unions in Niger
International Trade Union Confederation
Organisation of African Trade Union Unity
1960 establishments in Niger
Trade unions established in 1960